Mandar Agashe (IAST: Maṃdāra Āgāśe; born 24 May 1969) is an Indian businessman, music director, and former musician. Best known for having founded Sarvatra Technologies in 2000, he was one of the directors implicated in Suvarna Sahakari Bank's alleged scam case in 2008. He is also known for his 1998 hit single Nazar Nazar.

Biography

Early life and family: 1969 – 1991 
Agashe was born on 24 May 1969 in Mumbai, Maharashtra, into an aristocratic and entrepreneurial Chitpavan brahmin family of industrialist Dnyaneshwar Agashe of the Agashe gharana of Mangdari, and wife Rekha Gogte, of the Gogte gharana of Belgaum.

Through his father, Agashe is a grandson of Chandrashekhar Agashe, a nephew of Panditrao Agashe, an older brother of Ashutosh Agashe, of distant relation to Third Anglo-Maratha War general Bapu Gokhale, musician Ashutosh Phatak, historian Dinkar G. Kelkar, and scientist P. K. Kelkar. Through his mother, he is a great-nephew of B. M. Gogte, a descendant of the aristocratic Latey (Bhagwat) family, and of relation to Kokuyo Camlin head Dilip Dandekar, and academic Jyoti Gogte.

Agashe graduated with a BE degree in software engineering from the Pune Institute of Computer Technology in 1990. He has been married to Aparna Pandharkar since 1996; she adopted the name Jiza Agashe upon marriage. They have two children.

Early business career: 1991 – 2008 
In 1991, Agashe was appointed to the board of directors at his grandfather's Brihan Maharashtra Sugar Syndicate, going on to become the joint managing director of the syndicate in 1994, the same year he was appointed a director on his father's Suvarna Sahakari Bank. He founded a number of companies under the Brihans Group – Brihans Pharmaceuticals, an ayurvedic medicine company in 1998, and musicurry.com, an internet radio company in 1999, the same year, he resigned as joint managing director of the syndicate.

By December 1999, Agashe and his CEO Gautam Godse had partnered with California-based software company Questionable Ventures to develop musicurry.com, and in January 2000 he invited Usha Mangeshkar to be the internet radio's creative consultant, with Agashe announcing plans to upload the Mangeshkar family archives to the web service by February–March 2000. The web service was officially launched on 13 January 2000.

In April 2000, he founded Brihans Natural Products Ltd., a skincare products manufacturing company, and under him launched its signature aloe vera product range in 2002. In June 2000, he established Sarvatra Technologies, a company that developed banking software for Suvarna Sahakari Bank; alongside his other financial technology companies, EBZ Online and Codito Technologies, also being founded in 2000. In 2002, Agashe purchased stake in Deepak Ghaisas' I-flex Solutions, after the company agreed to partner with Codito, with Ghaisas joining the board of directors.

In 2006, Agashe launched "Anywhere Money" POS terminals under his company Saravatra Technologies to praise and support from politicians such as Shankarrao Gadakh in the Government of Maharashtra. By 2007, Agashe had merged the business operations of EBZ Technologies and Codito with Sarvatra Technologies and partnered with Larry Ellison at the Oracle Corporation to introduce banking software technology to rural India, after the Reserve Bank of India's governor Y. V. Reddy and economist Raghuram Rajan approved the plans in January 2008.

Suvarna Sahakari Bank case: 2008 – 2009 

In November 2008, Agashe was one of the directors implicated during Suvarna Sahakari Bank's ₹4.3 billion alleged scam case. His family, along with other board members of the bank, were arrested on the charges of alleged misuse of their rights to sanction loans to firms owned by themselves and then defaulting those loans, thereby duping the bank's depositors. Agashe was in Germany at the time of the arrests, returning to India for his father's funeral in January 2009.

Agashe was taken into judicial custody in February 2009. After his father's death, Agashe was approached by former depositors of the bank for repayment of the defaulted loans. In early March 2009, he was remanded to magisterial custody after his initial plea for bail was rejected. He was charged with having sanctioned forged loan proposals amounting to ₹1.13 billion. Agashe was subsequently released on bail on 11 March, but was kept under house arrest until the bank merger was resolved. The bank was eventually dissolved and merged with the Indian Overseas Bank in May 2009.

Later business career: 2009 – present 
In 2011, Agashe launched Sarvatra's POS terminals to Urban co-operative banks in the Solapur district. Under Agashe's chairmanship, having previously been appointed the company's vice-chair as of 2018, the company's financial switch helping 450 co-operative banks and 50 urban co-operative banks, by 2018 and by 2020 respectively, connect to India's National Electronic Funds Transfer service.

In 2020, at the start of the COVID-19 pandemic, Agashe announced he would consider making half of his employees work from home post-lockdown. As of 2021 and 2022, Agashe is often quoted by several publications as an expert for the banking software and financial technology sectors.

Musical career 
During his final year in college, Agashe was introduced to Hridaynath Mangeshkar, who invited him to compose music for the Shirish Atre-Pai-authored Marathi poem Khulya Khulya Re Pavasa, sung by Asha Bhosle for the Marathi movie Hey Geet Jeevanache (1995). Previously in 1994, Agashe had recorded an English rock music album in Indianapolis, citing The Beatles as a major influence. In 1997, he released his first Marathi language album titled Achanak. In 1998, he released his first Hindi language album titled Nazar Nazar. The album was produced by Ashutosh Phatak and Dhruv Ghanekar and released in India by Sony BMG.

In 2003, Agashe released a new age-techno track titled I Need Someone in Germany. In 2005, he further released a double-sided album titled Two of Us featuring an album of Hindi pop music titled Jaan Le and an album of English rock music titled F. C. Road.

In April 2016, he music directed a western pop album of Suresh Bhat's ghazals in Marathi with Asha Bhosle called 82. The album was titled after Bhosle's age at the time of recording. Recorded within one week, the album consisted of ghazals given to Agashe by Bhat. In a televised launch for the album, hosted by Sudhir Gadgil, Agashe and Bhosle also announced a competition for fan-made music videos to the songs on the album.

In June 2021, Agashe music directed a Marathi retro music album of Suresh Bhat's poems and ghazals with Rahul Deshpande titled Theek Aahe, Chaan Aahe, Masta Aahe. Recorded during the COVID-19 lockdown in India, the album was produced by Vivek Paranjape and featured Aarya Ambekar, Dhanashree Deshpande-Ganatra, and Pranjali Barve as guest vocalists.

Discography

As a solo artist 
Achanak (1997)
Nazar Nazar (1998)
 I Need Someone – Single (2003)
Two of Us (2005)

As music director 
82 (2016) by Asha Bhosle
Theek Aahe, Chaan Aahe, Masta Aahe (2021) by Rahul Deshpande

References

Bibliography

External links 

Living people
Marathi people
Businesspeople from Pune
Businesspeople from Maharashtra
Singers from Pune
Marathi-language singers
Hindi-language singers
English-language singers from India
Music directors
Indian chief executives
Indian singers
Indian songwriters
Indian composers
Indian producers
Indian guitarists
Indian company founders
Indian technology company founders
Indian technology businesspeople
Indian technology chief executives
20th-century Indian businesspeople
21st-century Indian businesspeople
20th-century Indian musicians
21st-century Indian musicians
1969 births